The Sibley Guide to Bird Life & Behavior is a book by David Allen Sibley that shows readers "how birds live and what they do." It is different from most field-identification guides that birdwatchers carry around; rather than help identify birds, it helps watchers gain a deeper understanding of the birds they have already identified. Instead of concentrating on individual species, the book summarizes information for families of birds, presenting "broad patterns" to help readers interpret what they see. The guide includes nearly 800 of Sibley's paintings.

The book was first published by Knopfin 2001. In its first nine months, it sold 500,000 copies. A paper back version was released in 2009.

References

Notes
Sibley Guide to Bird Life & Behavior reference list

2001 non-fiction books
Bird field guides
Alfred A. Knopf books